Philochortus rudolfensis, the southern shield-backed lizard, is a species of lizard found in Kenya and Ethiopia.

References

Philochortus
Reptiles described in 1932
Taxa named by Hampton Wildman Parker